Generic City is an extended play by Australian rock band Regurgitator, credited as Regurgitator meets Pnau, Friendly & Sugiurumn and released on a limited edition 12" Vinyl EP in September 2000. The EP features the remixed versions of three songs from the group's third studio album, ...art.

Track listing

Release history

References

2000 EPs
EPs by Australian artists
Regurgitator albums
East West Records albums